Coccinella hieroglyphica is a species of beetle in family Coccinellidae. It is found in the Palearctic. 
Coccinella hieroglyphica is found in Europe, European Russia, Siberia, the Russian Far East,  Belarus, Ukraine, Kazakhstan, Mongolia, China, Korea. 
In Europe, in the north beyond the Polar circle, in the south to Northern Italy. They live in heath and moorland habitats to heights of 1,200 meters, on different Ericaceae, feeding on aphids. Other, less preferred, habitats are wet meadows, marshes, wastelands, and mixed forests. Other host plants are Pinus abies and other Pinus species  and various Betula species. Their populations vary greatly from year to year. They fly from May to October and overwinter in coarse woody debris under pines and birches.  In the former USSR, it is aphidophagous on Salix species, birches, and on Alnus  and Poaceae

References

Coccinellidae
Beetles described in 1758
Taxa named by Carl Linnaeus